Bluff Springs can refer to:

Places
United States
Bluff Springs, Texas
Bluff Springs, Illinois
Bluff Springs Township, Cass County, Illinois